Many famous neuroscientists are from the 20th and 21st century, as neuroscience is a fairly new science. However many anatomists, physiologists, biologists, neurologists, psychiatrists and other physicians and psychologists are considered to be neuroscientists as well. This list compiles the names of all neuroscientists with a corresponding Wikipedia biographical article, and is not necessarily a reflection of their relative importance in the field.

See also 
 History of neuroscience
 List of cognitive neuroscientists
 List of neurologists and neurosurgeons
 List of women neuroscientists

References 

 
Cognitive science lists
History of neurology